Shangjie is one of 6 urban districts of the prefecture-level city of Zhengzhou, the capital of Henan Province, South Central China, located about  west of the city proper in between the Yellow River to the north and Mount Song to the south; it is not contiguous with the other five districts of Zhengzhou. Shangjie District was established as an industrial zone in 1958.

Administrative divisions
There are five subdistricts and one town under the district's administration:
Subdistricts
Jiyuanlu Subdistrict
Zhongxinlu Subdistrict
Xin'anlu Subdistrict
Gongyelu Subdistrict
Kuangshan Subdistrict

Towns
Xiawo

References

External links
Official website of Shangjie District government

Districts of Zhengzhou
Populated places established in 1958
1958 establishments in China